Louis Leo Holtz (born January 6, 1937) is an American former football player, coach, and analyst. He served as the head football coach at The College of William & Mary (1969–1971), North Carolina State University (1972–1975), the New York Jets (1976), the University of Arkansas (1977–1983), the University of Minnesota (1984–1985), the University of Notre Dame (1986–1996), and the University of South Carolina (1999–2004), compiling a career record of 249–132–7. Holtz's 1988 Notre Dame team went 12–0 with a victory in the Fiesta Bowl and was the consensus national champion. Holtz is the only college football coach to lead six different programs to bowl games and the only coach to guide four different programs to the final top 20 rankings.

After retiring from coaching, Holtz worked as a TV college football analyst for CBS Sports in the 1990s and ESPN from 2005 until 2015. On May 1, 2008, Holtz was elected to the College Football Hall of Fame.

Early life and coaching career
Holtz was born in Follansbee, West Virginia, the son of Anne Marie (Tychonievich) and Andrew Holtz, a bus driver. His father was of German and Irish descent, while his maternal grandparents were emigrants from Chernobyl, Ukraine. He grew up in East Liverpool, Ohio, where he was raised as a Roman Catholic. He graduated from East Liverpool High School.  After high school, Holtz attended Kent State University. He was a member of the Delta Upsilon fraternity, and graduated in 1959 with a degree in history. Holtz also trained under Kent State's Army Reserve Officers' Training Corps and earned a commission as a Field Artillery Officer in the United States Army Reserve at the time of his graduation from college.  He began his coaching career as a graduate assistant in 1960, at Iowa, where he received his master's degree. From there, he made stops as an assistant at William & Mary (1961–1963), Connecticut (1964–1965), South Carolina (1966–1967) and Ohio State (1968). The 1968 Ohio State Buckeyes football team won a national championship with Holtz as an assistant.

William & Mary
Holtz's first job as head coach came in 1969, at the College of William & Mary, who played in the Southern Conference at that time. In 1970, he led the William & Mary Indians (now Tribe) to the Southern Conference title and a berth in the Tangerine Bowl.

North Carolina State
In 1972, Holtz moved to North Carolina State University and had a 33–12–3 record in four seasons. His first three teams achieved final Top 20 rankings, including a final Top 10 finish in the 1974 Coaches Poll.  His 1973 team won the ACC Championship. His Wolfpack teams played in four bowl games, going 2–1–1. Holtz received offers to become the Tulane head coach. He at first accepted the offer from David Dixon, the New Orleans Saints founder, then Holtz called Dixon saying he wouldn't come to Tulane.  Following the 1975 season, Holtz accepted an offer to leave college football and become the head coach of the NFL's New York Jets.

New York Jets
Holtz's lone foray into the professional ranks began when he was appointed as head coach of the New York Jets on February 10, 1976. He was selected over Johnny Majors, Darryl Rogers, and Marv Levy. Holtz resigned ten months later on December 9 with the Jets at 3–10 and one game remaining in the 1976 season. Upon his departure, he lamented, "God did not put Lou Holtz on this earth to coach in the pros." Holtz's jump to the NFL as head coach for only thirteen games with a 3–10 record before returning to the college game with Arkansas would be duplicated eerily similarly by Bobby Petrino 31 years later in 2007; another 14 years after, his run would be matched in terms of length and broken in terms of record by Urban Meyer, fired by the Jacksonville Jaguars with a 2–11 record in 2021.

Arkansas
Holtz went to the University of Arkansas in 1977. In his seven years there, the Razorbacks compiled a 60–21–2 record and reached six bowl games. In his first season at Arkansas, he led them to a berth in the 1978 Orange Bowl against the Oklahoma Sooners, then coached by University of Arkansas alumnus Barry Switzer. The Sooners were in position to win their third national championship in four seasons after top-ranked Texas lost earlier in the day to fifth-ranked Notre Dame in the Cotton Bowl Classic.  Arkansas' chances looked slim after the team lost several key personnel just before the game.  In one of his last practices, All-American guard, Leotis Harris suffered a season-ending injury, and only a couple of days later Holtz suspended both starting running backs, Ben Cowins and Michael Forrest, and top receiver, Donny Bobo, for disciplinary reasons.  However, behind an Orange Bowl record of 205 yards rushing from reserve running back Roland Sales the Hogs defeated the Sooners, 31–6. That team was recognized by the Rothman (FACT) poll as co-national champions, along with Texas and Notre Dame for 1977. Holtz was widely considered to be the leading candidate to replace Woody Hayes at Ohio State in 1979, but Holtz did not pursue the job because he did not want to follow Hayes.

Holtz led Arkansas to a 10–2 record in 1979 and a share of the SWC championship, and a 9-2-1 record in 1982 with a Bluebonnet Bowl victory over Florida. Holtz was then dismissed following a 6–5 campaign in 1983. At the time, athletic director Frank Broyles stated that Holtz had resigned because he was "tired and burned out", and was not fired.  Broyles testified 20 years later that he had fired Holtz because he was losing the fan base with things he said and did.  Holtz confirmed that he had been fired, but that Broyles never gave him a reason, although reports cited his political involvement as a major reason: controversy arose over his having taped two television advertisements from his coach's office endorsing the re-election of Jesse Helms as Senator from North Carolina at a time when Helms was leading the effort to block Martin Luther King Jr. Day from becoming a national holiday.

Minnesota
Holtz accepted the head coaching job at the University of Minnesota before the 1984 season. The Golden Gophers had only won one game vs. Rice in 1983, but under Holtz won 4 games, including 3 in the Big Ten. In 1985 the team was 7-5 and were invited to the Independence Bowl, where they defeated Clemson, 20–13. Holtz did not coach the Gophers in that bowl game, as he had already accepted the head coaching position at Notre Dame. His contract purportedly included a "Notre Dame clause" that allowed him to leave if that coaching job were to become available. This later proved to be false, as most standard contracts do not include a "Notre Dame" clause.

Holtz's tenure at Minnesota was not without controversy.  Just prior to the 1991 Orange Bowl, the NCAA implicated the Holtz-era Golden Gophers for recruiting violations.  Sanctions handed down in March 1991 included a bowl ban in 1992 for the Golden Gophers and "two more years ... [of] continued probation".

Notre Dame

In 1986, Holtz left Minnesota to take over the then-struggling Notre Dame Fighting Irish football program. A taskmaster and strict disciplinarian, Holtz had the names removed from the backs of the players' jerseys when he took over at Notre Dame, wanting to emphasize team effort. With the exception of select bowl games, names have not been included on Notre Dame's jerseys since. Although his 1986 squad posted an identical 5–6 mark that the 1985 edition had, five of their six losses were by a combined total of 14 points.  In the season finale against the archrival USC Trojans, Notre Dame overcame a 17-point fourth-quarter deficit and pulled out a 38–37 win.

In his second season, Holtz led the Fighting Irish to an appearance in the 1988 Cotton Bowl Classic, where the Irish lost to the Texas A&M Aggies, 35–10. The following year, Notre Dame won all eleven of their regular season games and defeated the third-ranked West Virginia Mountaineers, 34–21, in the Fiesta Bowl, claiming the national championship. The 1989 squad also won their first eleven games (and in the process set a school record with a 23-game winning streak) and remained in the No. 1 spot all season until losing to Miami in the season finale.  A 21–6 win over Colorado in the Orange Bowl gave the Irish a second-place ranking in the final standings, as well as back-to-back 12-win seasons for the first time in school history.

Holtz's 1993 Irish team ended the season with an 11–1 record and ranked second in the final AP poll. Although the Florida State Seminoles were defeated by the Irish in a battle of unbeatens during the regular season and both teams had only 1 loss at season's end (Notre Dame lost to seventeenth-ranked Boston College), FSU was then voted national champion in the final 1993 AP and Coaches Poll. Between 1988 and 1993, Holtz's teams posted an overall 64–9–1 record.  He also took the Irish to bowl games for nine consecutive seasons, still a Notre Dame record.

Following an investigation in 1999, the NCAA placed Notre Dame on two years probation for extra benefits provided to football players between 1993 and 1999 by Kim Dunbar, a South Bend bookkeeper involved in a $1.4 million embezzlement scheme at her employer, as well as one instance of academic fraud that occurred under Holtz's successor, Bob Davie. The NCAA found that Holtz and members of his staff learned of the violations but failed to make appropriate inquiry or to take prompt action, finding Holtz's efforts "inadequate."

On September 13, 2008, Lou Holtz was invited back to the campus where a statue of the former coach was unveiled.  The ceremony took place during the weekend of the Notre Dame/Michigan game, almost twenty-two years to the day after Holtz coached his first Notre Dame team against the Wolverines.

Occasionally, despite his lack of success with the New York Jets, he was rumored to be leaving Notre Dame for the NFL. Following a 6–10 season in 1990 and an 8-8 showing in 1991, the Minnesota Vikings were rumored to replace Jerry Burns with Holtz.  However, Holtz denied these rumors each of those two seasons.  Holtz remained at Notre Dame; the Vikings, meanwhile, hired Dennis Green to replace the retired Jerry Burns.  Ironically, as shown below, Holtz nearly replaced Green five years later.

First retirement
Lou Holtz left Notre Dame after the 1996 season and walked away from a lifetime contract for undisclosed reasons.   In 1996, two members of the Minnesota Vikings's ownership board, Wheelock Whitney and Jaye F. Dyer, reportedly contacted Holtz. They wanted to bring him in to replace Dennis Green. Of the rumors surrounding the reasons for Holtz's retirement, one of them was the possible Vikings head coaching position.

South Carolina
After two seasons as a commentator for CBS Sports, Holtz came out of retirement in 1999 and returned to the University of South Carolina, where he had been an assistant in the 1960s. The year before Holtz arrived, the Gamecocks went 1–10, and the team subsequently went 0–11 during Holtz's first season.  In his second season, South Carolina went 8–4, winning the Outback Bowl over the heavily favored Ohio State Buckeyes. The eight-game improvement from the previous year was the best in the nation in 2000 and the third best single-season turnaround in NCAA history. It also earned National Coach of the Year honors for Holtz from Football News and American Football Coaches Quarterly. In his third season, Holtz's success continued, leading the Gamecocks to a 9–3 record and another Outback Bowl victory over Ohio State. The nine wins for the season were the second highest total in the history of the program.  Under Holtz's leadership, the Gamecocks posted their best two-year mark in school history from 2000 to 2001, going 17–7 overall and 10–6 in SEC play.

After consecutive 5–7 campaigns in 2002 and 2003, Holtz finished his South Carolina tenure on a winning note with a 6–5 record in 2004. Holtz's time in Columbia saw the resurrection of Gamecock Football, as the program had only one bowl win and no Top 25 finishes in the ten years before his hire.  Upon his exit, USC had posted AP Top 25 finishes in 2000 and 2001 (#19 and No. 13 respectively) and had made consecutive New Year's Day bowls for the first time in its history. Holtz finished his six-year tenure at South Carolina with a 2–4 record versus his former team, Arkansas, beating the Razorbacks in Columbia, SC in 2000 and 2004.

In 2005, the NCAA imposed three years probation and reductions in two scholarships on the program for ten admitted violations under Holtz, five of which were found to be major. The violations involved improper tutoring and off-season workouts, as well as a lack of institutional control. No games were forfeited, and no television or postseason ban was imposed.  Holtz issued a statement after the sanctions were announced stating, "There was no money involved. No athletes were paid. There were no recruiting inducements. No cars. No jobs offered. No ticket scandal.".

Second retirement

On November 18, 2004, Holtz announced that he would retire at the end of the season. On November 20, 2004, the Clemson – South Carolina brawl took place during Holtz's last regular season game. Instead of ending his career at a post-season bowl game, which was expected, the two universities announced that each would penalize their respective football programs for their unsportsmanlike conduct by declining any bowl game invitations.  At his last press conference as South Carolina's coach, Holtz said it was ironic that he and former Ohio State coach Woody Hayes both would be remembered for "getting into a fight at the Clemson game".  Holtz also alluded to his assistance in recruiting his successor, Steve Spurrier.

Books
Holtz has written or contributed to 10 books:

 
 
 
 
 
 
 
 
 
 
Holtz, Lou (2019). Three Rules for Living a Good Life: A Game Plan for After Graduation. Notre Dame: Ave Maria Press. .

Broadcasting career
Holtz has worked for CBS Sports as a college football analyst and in the same capacity for the cable network ESPN. He worked on the secondary studio team, located in Bristol as opposed to the game site. He typically appeared on pregame, halftime, and postgame shows of college football games. In addition, he appeared on College Football Scoreboard, College Football Final, College Football Live, SportsCenter, and the occasional game. He typically partnered with Rece Davis and Mark May. Holtz came under scrutiny after referencing Adolf Hitler in an on-air comment while appearing on College Football Live in 2008. In his analysis of Michigan Wolverines head coach Rich Rodriguez, Holtz stated sarcastically, "Ya know, Hitler was a great leader, too." The next day, Holtz apologized for the comment during halftime of a game between Clemson and Georgia Tech. On April 12, 2015, it was reported by SB Nation that Holtz was leaving ESPN.

Personal life

Holtz was married to Beth Barcus from July 22, 1961, until her death from cancer on June 30, 2020. Holtz currently resides in Lake Nona Golf & Country Club in Orlando, Florida. He and Beth had four children, three of whom are Notre Dame graduates. His cousins Ashton and Kerosene Holtz both played football in Fort Scott, Kansas, as a linebacker and defensive end. Holtz is on the Catholic Advisory Board of the Ave Maria Mutual Funds, and gives motivational speeches. Coach Holtz is a member at the Augusta National Golf Club in Augusta, Georgia.  On June 23, 2015, Holtz's Lake Nona home was damaged by a house fire that was most likely triggered by a lightning strike.

Political views
Holtz has long been active in Republican Party politics, including his support for Helms, hosting former Vice President Dan Quayle in a 1999 fundraising tour, speaking at a 2007 House Republicans strategy meeting and considering entering the Republican primary for a Congressional seat in Florida in 2009. However, he also made a contribution of $2,300 to the campaign of Democratic Party Presidential candidate Hillary Clinton in 2008. In 2016, Holtz endorsed Donald Trump for president. In 2020, Holtz voiced his support for Amy Coney Barrett's nomination the United States Supreme Court. He often appears on Hannity on the Fox News Channel.

On August 26, 2020, Holtz spoke at the Republican National Convention endorsing Donald Trump for re-election. 
During his address at the 2020 Republican National Convention, Holtz said that Democratic Presidential Nominee Joe Biden was "a Catholic in name only." The University of Notre Dame also released a statement the following day to distance itself from Holtz's comment regarding Biden.

Holtz has been vocal about his disapproval of Colin Kaepernick taking a knee before NFL games and NFL commissioner, Roger Goodell allowing players to do so. Holtz told Scoop B Radio's Brandon Scoop B Robinson that players should go to inner city neighborhoods and be influential in their community, rather than kneeling.

Popular culture
Holtz appeared as himself in a Discover Card commercial in November 2011.

Honors
In 1990, Holtz received the Golden Plate Award of the American Academy of Achievement. Holtz was awarded an honorary Doctor of Laws from the University of Notre Dame on May 22, 2011. On April 19, 2012, Holtz was inducted into the Cotton Bowl Hall of Fame.  Holtz was also awarded an honorary Doctor of Education from the University of South Carolina on December 17, 2012.  Holtz was awarded an honorary Doctor in Public Service from Trine University and elected to the board of trustees in 2011. Trine also honored Holtz in 2013 by naming a program the Lou Holtz Master of Science in Leadership Program. He was also awarded an honorary Doctorate in Communications from Franciscan University of Steubenville on May 9, 2015, and delivered a commencement address. Holtz was elected to the Arkansas Sports Hall of Fame in 1983, and the Upper Ohio Valley Hall of Fame in 1998. On December 3, 2020, Holtz was awarded the Presidential Medal of Freedom by President Donald Trump.

Head coaching record

College

Source:

NFL

Coaching tree
Assistant coaches under Holtz who became college or professional head coaches:
 Mike Holovak: New York Jets (1976)
 Bo Rein: NC State (1976–1979)
 Walt Michaels: New York Jets (1977–1982), New Jersey Generals (1984–1985)
 Monte Kiffin: NC State (1980–1982)
 Harold Horton: Central Arkansas (1982–1989)
 Bob Cope: Pacific (CA) (1983–1988)
 John Gutekunst: Minnesota (1985–1991)
 Jim Strong: UNLV Rebels (1990–1993)
 Barry Alvarez: Wisconsin (1990–2005)
 Houston Nutt: Murray State (1993–1996), Boise State (1997), Arkansas (1998–2007), Ole Miss (2008–2011)
 Jeff Horton: Nevada (1993), UNLV (1994–1998), Minnesota (2010)
 Pete Carroll: New York Jets (1994), New England Patriots (1997–1999), USC (2000–2009), Seattle Seahawks (2010–present)
 Rick Minter: Cincinnati (1994–2003)
 Skip Holtz: Connecticut (1994–1998), East Carolina (2005–2009), South Florida (2010–2012), Louisiana Tech (2013–2021)
 Fred von Appen: Hawaii (1996–1998)
 Bob Davie: Notre Dame (1997–2001), New Mexico (2012–2019)
 Jerry Partridge: Missouri Western (1997–2016)
 Dave Roberts: Baylor (1997–1998)
 Dean Pees: Kent State (1998–2003)
 Urban Meyer: Bowling Green (2001–2002), Utah (2003–2004), Florida (2005–2010), Ohio State (2012–2018), Jacksonville Jaguars (2021)
 Oliver Pough: South Carolina State (2002–present)
 John Thompson: East Carolina (2003–2004)
 Rick Stockstill: Middle Tennessee (2006–present)
 Joker Phillips: Kentucky (2010–2012)
 Charlie Strong: Louisville (2010–2013), Texas (2014–2016), South Florida (2017–2019)
 Todd Monken: Southern Miss (2013-2015)

See also
 List of college football coaches with 200 wins
 List of National Football League head coaches

Notes

References

External links

 
 
 The Lou Holtz/Upper Ohio Valley Hall of Fame

1937 births
Living people
American football linebackers
Arkansas Razorbacks football coaches
Iowa Hawkeyes football coaches
Kent State Golden Flashes football players
Minnesota Golden Gophers football coaches
NC State Wolfpack football coaches
New York Jets head coaches
Notre Dame Fighting Irish football coaches
Ohio State Buckeyes football coaches
South Carolina Gamecocks football coaches
UConn Huskies football coaches
William & Mary Tribe football coaches
College football announcers
National Football League announcers
College Football Hall of Fame inductees
Presidential Medal of Freedom recipients
Florida Republicans
United States Army officers
People from East Liverpool, Ohio
People from Follansbee, West Virginia
Coaches of American football from Ohio
Players of American football from Ohio
Catholics from Ohio